Inger Arnesson (born 12 April 1953) is a former Swedish footballer.  Andersson has played for Sunnanå SK, she was also was a member of the Swedish national team that won the 1984 European Competition for Women's Football.

References

1953 births
Living people
Sunnanå SK players
Damallsvenskan players
Women's association football goalkeepers
Swedish women's footballers
Sweden women's international footballers
Women's association football midfielders
UEFA Women's Championship-winning players